La Faloise is a railway station located in the commune of La Faloise in the Somme department, France.  It is served by TER Hauts-de-France trains from Creil to Amiens. Its elevation is 85 m.

It was first opened on 20 June 1846, when the Paris-Amiens section of the Paris–Lille railway was opened.

The monument

The monument located on the platform facing Paris commemorates the fatal accident that occurred on 20 September 1910. Three employees of the Compagnie du Nord, Jean Hein, Adolphe Cras and Alcide Foy, were killed as they were hit by a fast train.

Gallery

See also
List of SNCF stations in Hauts-de-France

References

Railway stations in Somme (department)
Railway stations in France opened in 1846